Dhool Parakuthu is a 1993 Indian Tamil-language film directed by L. Raja, starring Raghuvaran in lead role.

Plot

Dhool Parakuthu is the story of Raghuvaran, a man with golden heart loved by Ramya Krishnan. Raghuvaran's family get killed by Malaysia Vasudevan and his henchmen. Now Raghuvaran wants to take law in his hand, but he is stopped by his police officer friend Ravi Raghavendra. Will Raghuvaran completes his revenge form the climax.

Cast

Raghuvaran
Ramya Krishnan
Sindhuja
Ravi Raghavendra
Malaysia Vasudevan
S. S. Chandran
Senthil
Kovai Sarala

References

External links

1993 films
1990s Tamil-language films